Stangvik Church is a parish church of the Church of Norway in Surnadal Municipality in Møre og Romsdal county, Norway.  It is located in the village of Stangvik on the shores of the Stangvikfjorden.  It is the church for the Stangvik parish which is part of the Indre Nordmøre prosti (deanery) in the Diocese of Møre.  The white, wooden church was built in a long church design in 1897 using plans drawn up by the architect Karl Norum and the builder Lars Mogstad.  The church seats about 600 people, making it the largest church in Nordmøre.

History
The earliest existing historical records of the church date back to 1432 and in that record it states that the church was built in 1407. The church was richly decorated and was probably consecrated to either St. Olaf or the Virgin Mary. The church had a church porch on the west end and a sacristy on the east end. There was a corridor that went around the whole exterior of the building. On 27 November 1783, lightning struck the church which started a fire that burned down the church and surrounding rectory buildings and unfortunately a maid in the rectory was killed in the fire. In the following summer of 1784, a new church was completed on the same site as the old church. The builder was Fredrik Bertelson Eikrem. It was a timber-framed building with a cruciform ground plan, a tower on the roof over the intersection of the transepts and a church porch in both the east and north sides of the church. It was consecrated on 21 January 1785.

In 1814, this church served as an election church. Together with more than 300 other parish churches across Norway, it was a polling station for elections to the 1814 Norwegian Constituent Assembly which wrote the Constitution of Norway. This was Norway's first national elections. Each church parish was a constituency that elected people called "electors" who later met together in each county to elect the representatives for the assembly that was to meet in Eidsvoll later that year.

By the 1880s, the church was rather dilapidated so it was determined to replace the building. The old church was torn down in 1896 and work on the new building was in 1896–1897 on the new site. The new church is a wooden long church with a small sacristy in the east and a tower in the west end. The church was designed by Karl Norum and the lead builder was Lars O. Mogstad. Some materials from the 1784 cruciform church were reused in the new building, primarily in the tower. The new building was consecrated on 2 July 1897.

Media gallery

See also
List of churches in Møre

References

Surnadal
Churches in Møre og Romsdal
Wooden churches in Norway
Long churches in Norway
19th-century Church of Norway church buildings
Churches completed in 1897
15th-century establishments in Norway
Norwegian election church